Lufkin may refer to:
 Lufkin, Texas, a city in Angelina County, Texas, United States
 Lufkin, Wisconsin, an unincorporated community, United States
 Lufkin Industries, manufacturing company based in Lufkin, Texas
 Lufkin (brand), a brand featuring primarily measurement tools
 Lufkin Foresters, former minor league baseball team based in Lufkin, Texas
 The Lufkin Daily News, newspaper that serves the city of Lufkin, Texas

Education 
 Lufkin High School
 Lufkin Independent School District
 Lufkin Road Middle School

People 
 Caroline Lufkin
 Olivia Lufkin
 Richard H. Lufkin (1851–1922), inventor of the vamp folding machine
 Sam Lufkin
 Willfred W. Lufkin
 Aaron Lufkin Dennison
 Abraham P. Lufkin, Galveston city councilmen and Lufkin, Texas was named after him